Navarino is an unincorporated community located in the town of Navarino, Shawano County, Wisconsin, United States. As of the 2010 census, its population is 177. For statistical purposes, the United States Census Bureau has defined Navarino as a census-designated place (CDP).

In the 1920s and earlier, the community which makes up the CDP was known as Galesburg.

References

Census-designated places in Shawano County, Wisconsin
Census-designated places in Wisconsin